Kapp Thor is the southernmost point of Hopen in the Svalbard archipelago. It is named after fisheries advisor Thor Iversen.

See also
Beisaren – northernmost point of Hopen.
Iversenfjellet; – also named after Thor Iversen.

References

Headlands of Svalbard
Hopen (Svalbard)